Nedeljko "Ned" Bulatović (born 19 April 1938) is a Serbian former footballer and football manager.

Career
Bulatović played as a midfielder for Vojvodina, Enschedese Boys, Twente, NEC, Sittardia and Fortuna SC.

Coaching career
He managed Tongeren, Standard de Liège, Vitesse Arnhem, KV Mechelen, K.V. Oostende, the Gabon national team and various other Belgian clubs

References

External links
Career stats
Profile at Twentefiles.nl

 

1938 births
Living people
Serbian footballers
Serbian football managers
Yugoslav footballers
Yugoslav football managers
Yugoslav expatriate football managers
Expatriate football managers in Belgium
FK Vojvodina players
FC Twente players
NEC Nijmegen players
Fortuna Sittard players
Sydney United 58 FC players
Eredivisie players
Yugoslav expatriate footballers
Expatriate footballers in the Netherlands
Yugoslav expatriate sportspeople in the Netherlands
Yugoslav expatriate sportspeople in Belgium
Standard Liège managers
SBV Vitesse managers
K.V. Mechelen managers
K.V. Oostende managers
S.C. Eendracht Aalst managers
Association football midfielders